The European Reform Forum (ERF) is a committee of senior British politicians, journalists, academics, and businessmen who are seeking to produce a report on the future direction of the European Union. The members are drawn predominantly from a Conservative background. It was launched on 30 June 2005 in the Houses of Parliament in front of a large number of press. Over the six months of the UK presidency of the European Council the ERF took evidence from numerous people on both sides of the debate and produced a final report in December 2005. It advocated the renegotiation of British membership.

Membership
 Chairman - Lord Waddington GCVO PC QC DL
 Lord Tebbit CH PC
 Lord Weatherill PC DL
 Lord Rees-Mogg
 Lord Blackwell
 Sir Oliver Wright GCMG GCVO DSC
 David Heathcoat-Amory MP
 Bernard Jenkin MP
 Secretary - Bill Cash MP
 Brigadier Geoffrey Van Orden MBE MEP
 Professor Tim Congdon CBE
 Professor Patrick Minford CBE
 Martin Howe QC
 Roger Brooke
 Andrew Roberts
 Ruth Lea
 Janet Daley

People who have given evidence
 Lord Howell of Guildford PC
 Professor Lord Wallace of Saltaire
 Frederick Forsyth CBE
 Charles Grant, Director of the Centre for European Reform

External links
European Reform Forum website

Politics of the European Union